The Journal of Traumatic Stress (JTS) is a peer-reviewed academic journal published bimonthly by Wiley-Blackwell on behalf of the International Society for Traumatic Stress Studies.  the editor-in-chief is Patricia K Kerig (University of Utah). The journal covers research on the biopsychosocial aspects of trauma and publishes original articles, brief reports, reviews, commentaries, and special issues devoted to single topics.

According to the Journal Citation Reports, the journal has a 2011 impact factor of 2.721, ranking it 22nd out of 109 journals in the category "Psychology, Clinical" and 32nd out of 117 journals in the category "Psychiatry (Social Science)".

References

External links 
 

Bimonthly journals
Clinical psychology journals
English-language journals
Publications established in 1988
Stress (biological and psychological)
Wiley-Blackwell academic journals
Psychotherapy journals